Nesiophasma giganteum is a recently described species of stick insect, order Phasmatodea. It is endemic to Peleng. Adult females are large, typically measuring 250–300mm (10–12 inches) in body length. Both sexes are wingless.

References 

Insects described in 2021
Phasmatidae